Borneoridion is a monotypic genus of  comb-footed spiders containing the single species, Borneoridion spinifer. It was first described by C. Deeleman & J. Wunderlich in 2011, and is found on Borneo.

See also
 List of Theridiidae species

References

Monotypic Araneomorphae genera
Spiders of Asia
Theridiidae